Intimacy is a Spanish drama television series created by Verónica Fernández and Laura Sarmiento and produced by Txintxua Films for Netflix. It stars Itziar Ituño, Patricia López Arnaiz, Emma Suárez, Verónica Echegui, Ana Wagener and Yune Nogueiras. It premiered on 10 June 2022.

Premise 
A sex tape of a politician is leaked when she is running for the Mayorship of Bilbao.

Cast

Accolades 

|-
| rowspan = "5" align = "center"  | 2022 || rowspan = "4" | 24th Iris Awards || Best Actress || Itziar Ituño ||  || rowspan = "2" | 

|-
| Best Fiction || || 
|-
| Best Screenplay || Verónica Fernández, Laura Sarmiento || 
|-
| Best Fiction Direction || Jorge Torregrossa, Ben Gutteridge, Koldo Almandoz, Marta Font || 
|-
| 28th Forqué Awards || Best TV Actress || Itziar Ituño ||  || 
|-
| rowspan = "5" align = "center" | 2023 || rowspan = "4" | 10th Feroz Awards || colspan = "2" | Best Drama Series ||  || rowspan = "4" | 
|-
| Best Actress in a TV Series || Itziar Ituño || 
|-
| Best Supporting Actress in a TV Series || Patricia López Arnaiz || 
|-
| Best Screenplay in a TV Series || Verónica Fernández, Laura Sarmiento, José Luis Martín || 
|-
| 31st Actors and Actresses Union Awards || Best Television Actress in a Minor Role || Elisabeth Larena ||  || 
|}

References 

Spanish-language Netflix original programming
Television shows filmed in Spain
2020s Spanish drama television series
2022 Spanish television series debuts
Television shows set in Biscay